An order refers to each of a series of mouldings most often found in Romanesque and Gothic arches.

Arches and vaults
Architectural elements